Marcus Mann (born 14 March 1984) is a German former footballer who was most recently caretaker manager of 1. FC Saarbrücken.

Career
Mann began his career with Karlsruher SC, and broke into the first team in 2004, making two appearances in the 2. Bundesliga. He left the club in 2006, and spent the next two years in the Regionalliga Süd, playing for SV Darmstadt 98 and then Stuttgarter Kickers. In 2008, Kickers had qualified for the new 3. Liga, but were relegated after one season, so Mann moved on, joining 1. FC Saarbrücken. He helped the club win the Regionalliga West in his first season, and then establish themselves in the 3. Liga in his second. He signed for SV Wehen Wiesbaden in July 2011, where he spent three years before joining 1899 Hoffenheim II.

When he retired in 2016 he became director of sports at 1. FC Saarbrücken. Following the sacking of Dirk Lottner in December 2019, Mann was caretaker manager of Saarbrücken for the last game of 2019, a 6–0 win against TuS Rot-Weiß Koblenz.

Honours
Regionalliga West (IV): 2010

References

External links
 

1984 births
Living people
German footballers
Association football defenders
Association football midfielders
Karlsruher SC II players
Karlsruher SC players
SV Darmstadt 98 players
Stuttgarter Kickers players
1. FC Saarbrücken players
SV Wehen Wiesbaden players
TSG 1899 Hoffenheim II players
2. Bundesliga players
3. Liga players
People from Leonberg
Sportspeople from Stuttgart (region)
Footballers from Baden-Württemberg